Maria Chalon, or Susanna Maria van der Duyn (1698, The Hague – 1780, Amsterdam), was an 18th-century actress from the Northern Netherlands. She is best known as the wife of Cornelis Troost.

Biography
She was the illegitimate daughter of the actress Anna Maria Rigo and the gentleman Nicolaas van der Duyn of Rijswijk. Her mother married the 12-year-younger actor Louis Chalon when Susanna was ten, and from that moment called herself Maria Chalon. She later married the actor Cornelis Troost, whom she had met when they were both accepted as actors for the Amsterdam Schouwburg in 1717 where they were paid one guilder per play. After the death of her mother, Maria travelled in a travelling actor troupe with her father. In 1720, she married Troost in Zwolle, and they settled for a steady job in Amsterdam, where they both acted and he made the backdrop decorations until 1724, when they quit, he to take up portrait painting and she to take care of the family.

References

External links
 Susanna Maria van der Duyn on inghist

1698 births
1780 deaths
Actresses from The Hague
18th-century Dutch actresses